O 10 was a  patrol submarines of the Royal Netherlands Navy. The ship was built by Nederlandsche Scheepsbouw Maatschappij shipyard in Amsterdam.

Service history
The submarine was ordered on 9 August 1921 and laid down in Amsterdam at the shipyard of Nederlandsche Scheepsbouw Maatschappij on 24 December 1923. The launch took place on 30 July 1925. On 1 September 1926 the ship was commissioned in the Dutch navy.

In 1927 O 10,  and  made a visit to Norway.

In 1928 O 10, Hertog Hendrik, Z 5, Z 6 and Z 7 made a trip to the North Sea and visited Edinburgh. In 1929 O 10, Z 5, Z 6, made a trip to the Baltic Sea for exercises. The next year on 30 July 1930 O 9, O 10, Jacob van Heemskerck and  visited Antwerp.

In 1931 O 10, O 9, Jacob van Heemskerck, Z 7, Z 8, made again a trip to the Baltic Sea for exercises. She sailed for the Baltics again in 1936 with her sisters O 9, O 11, Hertog Hendrik and Z 5. In 1939 O 10 together with her sisters O 9, O 11 where attached to the coastal division. They acted as the offensive part of Dutch coastal defense.

From 9 to 11 May 1940 she and O 9 were on patrol off the coast of the Netherlands. During the patrol O 9 was attacked by German military airplanes. On 12 May 1940 she, O 9 and a tugboat fled to the United Kingdom where they arrived on 15 May 1940.

During the war she patrolled the English Channel, Atlantic Ocean and the Bay of Biscay. From July to August 1940 O 10 was attached to the 7th Training Flotilla in Rothesay and used as an ASDIC piggy boat. She was transferred to the 9th Flotilla in Dundee where she served from 30 August 1940 to July 1944.

On 11 October 1944 O 10 was decommissioned and in September 1946, stricken. October 1946 she was sold for scrapping.

References

Bibliography

External links
Description of ship

1925 ships
World War II submarines of the Netherlands
O 9-class submarines
Submarines built by Nederlandsche Scheepsbouw Maatschappij